USS Little Rock (CL-92/CLG-4/CG-4) is a -class light cruiser and one of 27 completed for the United States Navy during or shortly after World War II. She is one of six to be converted to guided missile cruisers and the first US Navy ship to be named for Little Rock, Arkansas. Commissioned in mid-1945, she was completed too late to see combat duty during World War II and was retired post-war, becoming part of the Atlantic Reserve Fleet in 1949.

In the late 1950s, she was converted to a  guided-missile cruiser, removing her aft six-inch and five-inch guns to accommodate the Talos missile system. Like three other of her sister Cleveland ships converted to missile ships, she was also extensively modified forward to become a flagship. This involved removal of most of her forward armament to allow for an enlarged superstructure and was recommissioned in 1960 as CLG-4 (redesignated CG-4 in 1975). In this configuration, she served in the Mediterranean, often as the Sixth Fleet flagship.

She decommissioned for the final time in 1976 and is now a museum ship, located in Buffalo, New York.

Construction and Commissioning
Little Rock was laid down by William Cramp & Sons Shipbuilding Company, Philadelphia, 6 March 1943; launched 27 August 1944, sponsored by Mrs Sam Wassell and commissioned 17 June 1945, with Capt. William E. Miller in command.

Service history

1945 to 1949
After shakedown off Cuba and training along the Atlantic coast, Little Rock departed Newport, Rhode Island on 21 October for South America. Following this five-month cruise, she returned to Norfolk on 23 March 1946. For the next two months, she performed exercises off the east coast and in the Caribbean, before sailing for Europe on 4 June. After operating with the 6th Fleet throughout the summer. Little Rock returned Norfolk on 27 September 1946.

From November 21–27, 1946,  was en route to Davis Strait as part of Task Group 20.2, which also included the cruiser Little Rock and destroyer . Between November 27 and December 4, she participated in cold-weather exercises, between Greenland and Baffin Island, as part of Task Group 20.2.

During the deployment, she was firing 5-inch star shells off the port side of Missouri for illumination, when there was a misfire. As the gunner began to point the barrel toward the water, as per standard procedure, the round cooked-off, (thermally induced firing) and struck Missouri on the signal bridge, killing Coxswain Robert Fountain and starting a fire involving an acetylene tank lashed to the railings. Missouri did not return to Norfolk until December 13, 1946.

From September 1946 to 1949, she took part in east coast exercises and operated in the Caribbean and Mediterranean during 1947 and 1948 before being decommissioned 24 June 1949, joining the Atlantic Reserve Fleet at New York.

Conversion to guided missile cruiser
This refit included replacing the aft six-inch turrets with a Talos missile battery. She recommissioned at Philadelphia 3 June 1960, with Capt. J. O. Phillips in command. The cruiser performed shakedown training in the Caribbean, test-firing her Talos missiles to prepare to join the Navy's fleet of guided missiles armed ships capable of delivering a nuclear warhead.

1961 to 1976
Departing Philadelphia 9 February 1961, Little Rock sailed for her first European deployment in her new role. After six months operating with the 6th Fleet and NATO units, she returned to Norfolk in September.

While operating in the Caribbean, 18 November 1961, Little Rock was ordered to the waters off Santo Domingo to provide an element of stability during the uncertainty and unrest following the assassination of Rafael Trujillo.

For the next four years Little Rock annually sailed to the Mediterranean, joining the 6th Fleet. as flagship from May to December 1963. Between deployments, she operated off the east coast, the Caribbean, and off northern Europe with other NATO countries, remaining on the east coast during 1966 for overhaul and refresher training. In 1967 she relieved  as the Sixth Fleet flagship at Rota Spain and proceeded to her new homeport at Gaeta, Italy.

In 1967 the Six-Day War broke out and she steamed to the eastern Mediterranean as NATO command ship. When Israeli forces mistakenly attacked , Little Rock went to her aid and provided medical assistance. During an exercise in mid-1970, she collided with the Greek destroyer Lonchi (D56), damaging her bow which was temporarily repaired at Malta. She returned to the United States in September for a major overhaul in Boston from November 1970 to the following spring.

Between 1970 and 1972, Raymond Edwin "Ray" Mabus, Jr. served aboard the Little Rock as a surface warfare officer, achieving the rank of Lieutenant Junior Grade. In 2009, Mabus was appointed as the seventy-fifth Secretary of the Navy, serving in the Obama administration.

On 5 June 1975 Little Rock participated in the ceremonies marking the reopening of the Suez Canal, she transited the northern part of the Canal from Port Said to Ismaïlia and made a port visit to Alexandria, Egypt.

In the spring of 1976, all US Navy Talos SAM systems were deactivated. Plans and funding for Little Rock to be modernized with a new weapon fit, a survey revealed her propulsion system required extensive repairs. Given the age of the ship, minimal repairs were made to allow transit to Norfolk and after further inspections, she was decommissioned in the fall of 1976.

Museum ship
After her decommissioning, Little Rock was towed via the Saint Lawrence Seaway to Buffalo, New York, where she is open to the public at the Buffalo Naval & Military Park.

References

Bibliography

External links

 USS Little Rock Association
 
USS Little Rock Photos on board the guided missile cruiser USS Little Rock in Buffalo, NY

 

Cleveland-class cruisers
Galveston-class cruisers
Cold War cruisers of the United States
Ships built by William Cramp & Sons
1944 ships
Museum ships in New York (state)
Museums in Buffalo, New York
Military and war museums in New York (state)